The following outline is provided as an overview of and topical guide to the plant Cannabis sativa and its relatives Cannabis indica and Cannabis ruderalis, the drug cannabis (drug) and the industrial product hemp.

Botany
Cannabis indica
Cannabis ruderalis
Cannabis sativa
Autoflowering cannabis
Cannabis strains

Economy
Cannabis industry
List of cannabis companies

Cannabis drug
Cannabis (drug)

Cannabis consumption
Adult lifetime cannabis use by country
Cannabis edible
Cannabis smoking

Chemicals
Cannabinoids
Cannabichromene (CBC) 
Cannabidiol (CBD) 
Cannabigerol (CBG)
Cannabicyclol (CBL) 
Cannabinol (CBN)
Cannabidivarin (CBDV)
Cannabinodiol (CBDL)
Tetrahydrocannabinol (THC)
Tetrahydrocannabinol-C4 (THC-C4)
Tetrahydrocannabivarin (THCV, THV)
Synthetic cannabinoids
Terpenes
Humulene
Limonene
Linalool
Myrcene
alpha-Pinene 
Nonmedical
Cannabis (drug)
Medical
Medical cannabis
Preparations and extracts
Kief
Charas
Cannabis flower essential oil
Tincture of cannabis
Hash oil
Hashish

Culture
Cannabis culture
Festivals and events
:Category:Cannabis events (main in lieu of list)
420 (cannabis culture)
Cannabis Cup
Hempfest (disambiguation), several events
Media
Cannabis advertising
Cannabis advertising in Denver
Digital
:Category:Cannabis websites
Weedtuber
Film and television
:Category:Films about cannabis
:Category:Television episodes about cannabis
:Category:Television series about cannabis
Cannabis exploitation films:
Assassin of Youth
Marihuana
Reefer Madness
She Shoulda Said No!
List of films containing frequent marijuana use
Public service announcements
Stoner Sloth
Stoner film
Stoner TV
List of cannabis hoaxes
Music
:Category:Cannabis music
Print
List of books about cannabis
List of cannabis columns
Cannabis cookbook
:Category:Books about cannabis
:Category:Plays about cannabis
:Category:Games about cannabis
:Category:Cannabis magazines
Religion
:Category:Cannabis and religion
Entheogenic use of cannabis

Effects
Effects of cannabis
Cannabis and impaired driving
Cannabis use disorder
Long-term effects of cannabis
Occupational health concerns of cannabis use
Scromiting

Farming and production
Cannabis cultivation 
:Category:Cannabis seed banks
List of hemp diseases
Cannabis product testing
Extraction
Ice extraction
Rosin (heat)
Liquid–liquid extraction (aka solvent extraction) (see also Hash oil)
Supercritical fluid extraction (CO2)
Indoor production
Aeroponics
Grow house
Grow light
Hydroponics
Regional farming
Hemp in Kentucky
Hemp in North Carolina
Hemp in Washington (state)

Laws and politics
General
Timeline of cannabis law
Cannabis drug testing
Cannabis rights
List of cannabis rights organizations
International law
Cannabis and international law (main)
Single Convention on Narcotic Drugs
United Nations Convention Against Illicit Traffic in Narcotic Drugs and Psychotropic Substances
National law
Canada: 
Cannabis Act
Cannabis and the Canadian military
Germany: 
Betäubungsmittelgesetz
Entwurf eines Cannabiskontrollgesetzes
Japan: Cannabis Control Law
United Kingdom: Cannabis classification in the United Kingdom
United States: 
Cole Memorandum
Congressional Cannabis Caucus
Legality of cannabis by U.S. jurisdiction
Cannabis on American Indian reservations
Decriminalization of non-medical cannabis in the United States
Marihuana Tax Act of 1937
Cannabis and the United States military
Removal of cannabis from Schedule I of the Controlled Substances Act 
United States case law
State decriminalization and legalization
 (main)
Timelines
:Category:2012 cannabis law reform
:Category:2014 cannabis law reform
List of 2016 United States cannabis reform proposals
List of 2017 United States cannabis reform proposals
List of 2018 United States cannabis reform proposals
Timeline of cannabis laws in the United States
Uruguay: Cannabis in Uruguay

Organizations
:Category:Cannabis industry trade associations
List of cannabis rights organizations
San Francisco Cannabis Buyers Club, first dispensary in U.S.

Products
List of hemp products

Hemp
Hemp fiber
Hemp hurds
Hemp oil
Miscellaneous products
Cannabis flower essential oil

Regional issues
Emerald Triangle

Science
Endocannabinoid system
Cannabinoid receptor
Cannabinoid receptor type 1 (CB1)
Cannabinoid receptor type 2 (CB2)
Medical cannabis research
Researchers
John W. Huffman
Raphael Mechoulam, discoverer of THC and Anandamide

See also
 
Glossary of cannabis

Footnotes

References

 
Cannabis-related lists
Cannabis
Cannabis
Cannabis